Congqian Youzuo Lingjianshan (从前有座灵剑山, literally "There was once a Spirit Blade Mountain") is a Chinese xianxia web novel series written by Guowang Bixia (国王陛下, a pen name meaning "His Majesty the King"), and a manhua version was hosted on the Tencent comics portal since 2014. An anime adaptation co-produced by Tencent and Studio Deen, and named  aired in January to March 2016, which was simulcast in Chinese and Japanese. A second season aired from January to March 2017.

Plot
In order to find a child fated by a falling comet that will bring calamity, the "Lingjian" (灵剑) clan resumes its entrance examination process to find disciples. Wang Lu, who possesses a special soul that only appears once in a thousand years, decides to take the exam and goes down the path toward becoming an exceptional sage.

Characters

The main protagonist. A genius whose IQ and impudence are unmatched.

Wang Lu's master who has a very wicked tongue.

Wang Lu's attendant who looks like a girl but is a boy.

The master of the "Lingjian" school.

Wang Lu's friend and fellow student.

Media

Manhua
 Spirit Blade Mountain

Anime
An anime television series based on the series premiered on January 8, 2016. The series is directed by Iku Suzuki and animated by Studio Deen, with character designs by Makoto Iino. Yumiko Ishii serves as the chief animation director. Hirofune Hane serves as art director, Kazuhisa Yamabu provides color key for the series, and Kazuya Tanaka is directing the sound, which is produced by Half HP Studio.

The opening theme is "Fast End", performed by After The Rain (the dues unit between the utaites Mafumafu and Soraru), and the ending theme song is "Kizuna" (Bonds), performed by Kakichoco.  The series aired on AT-X, Tokyo MX, KBS Kyoto, Sun TV, and TV Aichi.

A second season aired from January 8 to March 26, 2017.

Episode list

Season 1 (2016)

Season 2 (2017)

References

External links
  
  
  
 

2016 anime television series debuts
2017 anime television series debuts
2013 Chinese novels
Novels first published in serial form
Chinese novels adapted into television series
Manhua titles
Comedy comics
Fantasy comics
Television shows based on manhua
Studio Deen
Tokyo MX original programming
Chinese web series
Haoliners Animation League
2010s webcomics
Chinese webcomics
2014 webcomic debuts
Tencent manhua
Novels first published online